Dziergowice  Oderwalde  (German Oderwalde, until 1931: Dziergowitz) is a village in the administrative district of Gmina Bierawa, within Kędzierzyn-Koźle County, Opole Voivodeship, in south-western Poland.

In 2011 the German name "Oderwalde" was officially re-introduced.

The village has a population of 3,000.

Gallery

References

Dziergowice